KHYM is a Christian radio station broadcasting on 103.9 FM, licensed to Copeland, Kansas and serving the areas of Dodge City, Kansas, Garden City, Kansas, and Liberal, Kansas. The station is owned by Great Plains Christian Radio. KHYM began broadcasting December 23, 1997.

The station's format consists primarily of Christian music with midday and evening blocks of Christian talk and teaching.  Christian talk and teaching programs heard on KHYM include; In Touch with Dr. Charles Stanley, Back to the Bible, Leading The Way with Michael Youssef, Turning Point with David Jeremiah, Insight For Living with Chuck Swindoll, Focus on the Family.

Translators
KHYM is also heard on translators throughout Kansas and Oklahoma, as well as on full power station KHEV 90.3 in Fairview, Oklahoma.

Kansas

Oklahoma

References

External links 
KHYM's website

HYM
Radio stations established in 1997
1997 establishments in Kansas